Kurfi is a Local Government Area in Katsina State, Nigeria. Its headquarters are in the town of Kurfi, near the Gada River.

It has an area of 572 km and a population of 117,581 at the 2006 census.

The postal code of the area is 821.

References

Local Government Areas in Katsina State